NCAA student-athlete recruiting adheres to a strict process set forth by the NCAA, which includes timetables, regulations, and consequences for violations.

Process 
Coaches are allowed to contact players by sending questionnaires, sports camp brochures, and NCAA educational information to prospects as young as the seventh grade. This can lead to a prospect accepting an unofficial visit to a college campus. During these visits prospects can accept up to three complimentary admissions to sporting events, but may only talk to college coaches on school premises. High school student-athletes can verbally commit to attend a university when they feel comfortable with the program. This commitment is a non-binding agreement, and is not binding until the player signs a National Letter of Intent.

Regulations 
The NCAA posts the recruiting rulebook on-line. 

Division I coaches may not initiate phone calls with high school freshmen, sophomores, or juniors. However, these student-athlete prospects are allowed to initiate phone calls with Division I coaches if they please. July 1 following a prospect's junior year of high school officially starts the period in which coaches are allowed to initiate phone calls to prospects. 

Men's Basketball and Football have exceptions to this rule. September 1 of the prospect's senior year begins the period in which football coaches may initiate phone calls to prospects; with a one call per week limit. Men's Basketball coaches are allowed to make one phone call per month to a prospect after June 15 of their sophomore year. Following August 1 of the prospect's senior year, Men's Basketball coaches may make two phone calls per week. 

The NCAA Division I Committee on Infractions hands out punishment for rules violations. In the instance of the football program at the University of Colorado at Boulder, hearings were held between NCAA's infractions committee and university officials to determine how serious the infractions were and to decide fair punishment. On October 8, 2002, Colorado's football program was placed on two years' probation and the school's available football scholarships were cut from 25 to 20.

References

External links
Scout.com
RecruitHouse.com
FieldLevel.com

Recruiting